"It's Only Love" is a song by American blues rock band ZZ Top. It was released as the lead single from their fifth studio album Tejas (1976).

Cash Box called it a "spare and driving rocker" with "good quality." Record World called it "a very Rolling Stones-ish number"

Commercial performance
"It's Only Love" peaked at number 44 on the Billboard Hot 100.

Personnel
Billy Gibbons – guitar, harmonica, lead vocals
Dusty Hill – bass, co-lead vocals
Frank Beard – drums

Charts

References

1976 singles
ZZ Top songs
1976 songs
Songs written by Billy Gibbons
Songs written by Dusty Hill
Songs written by Frank Beard (musician)
Song recordings produced by Bill Ham